In logic, and in particular proof theory, a proof procedure for a given logic is a systematic method for producing proofs in some proof calculus of (provable) statements.

Types of proof calculi used
There are several types of proof calculi. The most popular are natural deduction, sequent calculi (i.e., Gentzen type systems), Hilbert systems, and semantic tableaux or trees. A given proof procedure will target a specific proof calculus, but can often be reformulated so as to produce proofs in other proof styles.

Completeness
A proof procedure for a logic is complete if it produces a proof for each provable statement. The theorems of logical systems are typically recursively enumerable, which implies the existence of a complete but extremely inefficient proof procedure; however, a proof procedure is only of interest if it is reasonably efficient.

Faced with an unprovable statement, a complete proof procedure may sometimes succeed in detecting and signalling its unprovability. In the general case, where provability is a semidecidable property, this is not possible, and instead the procedure will diverge (not terminate).

See also
 Automated theorem proving
 Proof complexity
 Proof tableaux
 Deductive system
 Proof (truth)

References
W. Quine 1982 (1950). Methods of Logic. Harvard Univ. Press.
Proof theory